During the 1916–17 English football season, Brentford competed in the London Combination, due to the cessation of competitive football for the duration of the First World War. Restricted by league rules mandating that all players must be members of the armed forces or munitions workers, Brentford finished third-from-bottom, having been forced to field over 50 guest players.

Season summary

Straddling the middle period the First World War, the London Combination introduced a new rule that for the 1916–17 season, stating all players must be members of the armed forces or munitions workers, which meant Brentford secretary-manager Fred Halliday (himself a worker at the Ministry of Munitions) had trouble securing players to play. Full back Dusty Rhodes, half back Alf Amos and forwards Patsy Hendren and Henry White would be the only pre-war Bees players to appear in more than half of the matches during the season. Albert Chester joined the club from Millwall in December 1916 and also appeared in over half the matches. Due to a wrist injury suffered by Ted Price, Bradford Park Avenue's Frank Drabble was the main goalkeeper during the season, while Croydon Common's William Bushell was also a regular in the half back line.

Brentford had a torrid season, winning just 9 of the 40 matches. Defeats by three, four, five and six goal margins were a regular occurrence, contributing to a total of 99 goals conceded during the campaign. 16 goals were conceded in four matches versus Luton Town. The highlights were a 7–0 victory over Portsmouth at Griffin Park on 30 December 1916 and Henry White's performances, who top-scored for the third-consecutive season with 20 goals from 35 matches.

The Battle of the Somme, which began on 1 July 1916, represented the lowest period so far for the British Army during the war and a number of former Brentford players were killed in the battle:

 Lieutenant Thomas Hamer, killed during the Battle of Mametz on 7 July 1916, while serving with the Royal Welch Fusiliers.
Sergeant Patrick Hagan, killed during the Battle of Bazentin Ridge on 14 July 1916, while serving with the Royal Scots.
Private John Hendren, killed during the Battle of Delville Wood on 27 July 1916, while serving with the Royal Fusiliers.
Privates Louis D'Abadie and Henry Purver, killed during the Battle of Delville Wood on 31 July 1916, while serving with the Royal Fusiliers.
 Private Harry Robotham, killed during the Battle of Flers–Courcelette on 12 September 1916, while serving with the Middlesex Regiment.
 Private Percy Matthews, missing, presumed killed, during the Battle of Le Transloy on 12 October 1916, while serving with the Essex Regiment.
Sergeant Joshua Hardisty MM, killed during the Battle of the Ancre on 18 November 1916, while serving with the Border Regiment.

Two other players died during the season:

 Lieutenant Alex Glen, who played at inside left during the 1908–09 season, was serving into the Royal Army Medical Corps when he committed suicide while in camp in Ripon, Yorkshire on 21 September 1916.
 Sergeant Henry Cook, died of wounds suffered near Maurepas, France, on 9 January 1917, while serving with the Yorkshire Regiment. He had appeared as a guest during the 1915–16 season.

League table

London Combination

Results
Brentford's goal tally listed first.

Legend

London Combination 

 Source: 100 Years Of Brentford

Playing squad 
Players' ages are as of the opening day of the 1916–17 season.

 Sources: 100 Years of Brentford, Timeless Bees, Football League Players' Records 1888 to 1939

Coaching staff

Statistics

Appearances and goals

Players listed in italics left the club mid-season.
Source: 100 Years of Brentford

Goalscorers 

Players listed in italics left the club mid-season.
Source: 100 Years of Brentford

Management

Summary

Transfers & loans 
Guest players' arrival and departure dates correspond to their first and last appearances of the season.

References 

Brentford F.C. seasons
Brentford